The Japan National Stadium, officially named  and formerly known as  or , is a multi-purpose stadium used mostly for association football in Kasumigaoka, Shinjuku, Tokyo, Japan. The facility served as the main stadium for the opening and closing ceremonies, as well as the venue for track and field athletics events at the 2020 Summer Olympics and 2020 Summer Paralympics in 2021.

Demolition of the old National Stadium was completed in May 2015, allowing for the construction of the new stadium to begin on 11 December 2016.

The original plans for the new stadium were scrapped in July 2015 by Japanese prime minister Shinzo Abe, who announced a rebid after a public outcry prompted by increased building costs. As a result, the new design was not ready for the 2019 Rugby World Cup, as originally intended. A new design created by architect Kengo Kuma was chosen in December 2015 to replace the original design, which was completed on 30 November 2019.

History
After Tokyo submitted their bid for the 2020 Summer Olympics, there was talk of possibly renovating or reconstructing the National Olympic Stadium. The stadium would host the opening and closing ceremonies as well as track and field events.

In February 2012, it was confirmed that the stadium would be demolished and reconstructed, and receive a £1 billion upgrade. In November 2012, renderings of the new national stadium were revealed, based on a design by architect Zaha Hadid. The stadium was demolished in 2015 and the new one was originally scheduled to be completed in March 2019. The new stadium will be the venue for athletics, rugby, some football games, and the opening and closing ceremonies of the Olympics and Paralympics.
 
The Japanese government announced several changes to Hadid's design in May 2015, citing budget constraints, including cancelling plans to build a retractable roof and converting some permanent seating to temporary seating. Several prominent Japanese architects, including Toyo Ito and Fumihiko Maki, criticized Hadid's design, with Ito comparing it to a turtle and Maki calling it a white elephant; others criticized the stadium's encroachment on the outer gardens of the Meiji Shrine. Arata Isozaki, on the other hand, commented that he was "shocked to see that the dynamism present in the original had gone" in the redesign of Hadid's original plan.

Even after design changes, the stadium was estimated to cost over 300 billion yen, more than three times the cost of the London Olympic Stadium and more than five times the cost of the Beijing Olympic Stadium.

The Japanese government reached an agreement in June 2015 with Taisei Corporation and Takenaka Corporation to complete the stadium for a total cost of around 250 billion yen. The new plan maintained the steel arch design while reducing the permanent capacity of the stadium to 65,000 in track mode with an additional 15,000 simple temporary seats available, allowing for an 80,000 capacity for football and the 2019 Rugby World Cup.

However, on 17 July 2015, Prime Minister of Japan Shinzō Abe announced that plans to build the new National Stadium would be scrapped and rebid upon amid public discontent over the stadium's building costs. As a result, Abe said that a replacement venue would have to be selected for the Rugby World Cup, as the new stadium would not be ready until the 2020 Olympics.

As of 28 August 2015, the Japanese Government released new standards for the National Stadium's reconstruction. The fixed capacity would be 68,000 and be expandable to 80,000 through the use of temporary seats over the athletics track. The government also abandoned the retractable roof; instead a permanent roof will be constructed over the spectator seating only.

And also, a sports museum and sky walkway that were part of the scrapped design were eliminated, while VIP lounges and seats were reduced, along with reduced underground parking facilities. These reductions result in a site of 198,500 square meters, 13% less than originally planned. Air conditioning for the stadium was also abandoned upon request of Japanese Prime Minister Shinzō Abe, and when asked about the abandonment Minister for the Olympics Toshiaki Endo stated that, "Air conditioners are installed in only two stadiums around the world, and they can only cool temperatures by 2 or 3°C".

Concern over indoor temperatures has also been raised, since, for cost reduction, Tokyo's New National Stadium was built without an air conditioner, and the roof was constructed over the spectator seating only.

The government slated a decision on contractors and a design by December 2015, with construction to begin at its latest in December 2016. Designers partnered with contractors to submit a design alongside construction cost and timing estimates. It has been revealed that the athletics track will be a permanent feature not to be demolished for the additional 12,000 seats for any future World Cup bid. As of 18 September 2015, two contractors submitted bids for the process: the Taisei Corporation working with architect Kengo Kuma, and a consortium of several major Japanese contractors including the Takenaka, Shimizu, and Obayashi corporations working with architect Toyo Ito. Former winning architect Zaha Hadid was unable to find a (Japanese) contractor willing to work with her design, and was therefore forced to abandon efforts to resubmit her revised design in the new competition.

On 21 December 2015, the Japan Sport Council announced that Kuma and the Taisei Corporation had been selected to design and construct the National Olympic Stadium. The stadium began construction in December 2016, and was set to conclude on 30 November 2019 when the stadium would be handed over to the International Olympic Committee (IOC) for necessary games and ceremony preparations, including test events. The new design would hold 68,089 in athletics mode with the ability to construct temporary seating over the permanent track to create an increased capacity of 80,016. Capacity during the Olympic Games will be 60,102 taking into account press and executive seating areas. This capacity is further lessened for the Paralympics to 57,750 to add more handicap accessible seating.  However, all events were held behind closed doors, so no spectators were allowed.

The inauguration took place on 21 December 2019 with a special ceremony.
The stadium’s inaugural sporting event, the 2019 Emperor's Cup final, took place on 1 January 2020. Vissel Kobe won their first ever trophy.

In October 2021, the Government of Japan decided to keep the athletics track and scrap the initial plan of removing it for an increased capacity for football and rugby matches, which was originally set in 2017. Additionally, it was announced that the stadium is currently bidding for hosting the 2025 World Athletics Championships.  The 2025 Athletics Championship will be the first major spectator event for athletics at the stadium.

Concerts

Description
The stadium is unusual in that timber is used as a major component of the structure, all of it sourced from Japan in order to reduce environmental impact. Many of the wooden elements are in modular form, which can be replaced when the timber deteriorates. The certified wood has been sourced from all 47 prefectures of Japan following a tradition started by the Meiji Shrine. The design of the eaves was inspired by the Hōryū-ji and incorporates air spaces which make best use of the prevailing wind conditions to ventilate the interior space. Part of the roof incorporates transparent solar panels and rain water is collected in underground cisterns and is used to irrigate the arena turf as well as the numerous plants on the top storey promenade. Accessibility has been a major concern, resulting in more than 450 places for wheelchair users, as well as toilets using the latest technology.

Gallery

Construction

References

External links
 
Japan National Stadium — Architecture | Kengo Kuma and Associates

Tokyo
American football in Japan
Athletics (track and field) venues in Japan
Buildings and structures in Shinjuku
Football venues in Japan
Japan
Olympic athletics venues
Olympic rugby venues
Rugby union stadiums in Japan
Rugby in Kantō
Sports venues completed in 2019
Sports venues in Tokyo
Venues of the 2020 Summer Olympics
2019 establishments in Japan
Kengo Kuma buildings